Neurobathra curcassi is a moth of the family Gracillariidae. It is known from Cuba.

The larvae feed on Jatropha species, including Jatropha curcas. They probably mine the leaves of their host plant.

References

Gracillariinae
Endemic fauna of Cuba